Eldorado (subtitled A Symphony by the Electric Light Orchestra) is the fourth studio album by the Electric Light Orchestra (ELO). It was released in the United States in September 1974 by United Artists Records and in the United Kingdom in October 1974 by Warner Bros. Records.

Concept
Eldorado is the first complete ELO concept album; bandleader Jeff Lynne conceived the storyline before he wrote any music. The plot follows a Walter Mitty-like character who journeys into fantasy worlds via dreams, to escape the disillusionment of his mundane reality. Lynne began to write the album in response to criticisms from his father, a classical music lover, who said that Electric Light Orchestra's repertoire "had no tune". The influence of The Beatles is prevalent, especially in the melody of the verse of "Mister Kingdom" which to some degree resembles the Beatles' "Across the Universe".

Recording
Eldorado marks the first album on which Jeff Lynne hired an orchestra; on previous albums, he would overdub the strings. Louis Clark co-arranged, with Lynne (and keyboardist Richard Tandy), and conducted the strings. The group's three resident string players continued to perform on recordings, however, and can be heard most prominently on the songs "Boy Blue" and "Laredo Tornado". Mike de Albuquerque departed early on in the recording process, as touring made him feel separated from his family. Lynne plays most of, if not all, the bass tracks and backing vocals for the album, but de Albuquerque still featured on the final release as well as getting credited. Kelly Groucutt replaced him for the subsequent tour, when cellist Melvyn Gale also joined (replacing the departing Mike Edwards). "Eldorado Finale" is heavily orchestrated, much like "Eldorado Overture". Jeff Lynne said of the song, "I like the heavy chords and the slightly daft ending, where you hear the double bass players packing up their basses, because they wouldn't play another millisecond past the allotted moment."

Cover design 
The cover was designed by John Kehe, simply of a frame of Dorothy's ruby slippers from the 1939 movie The Wizard of Oz.

Release, reception and aftermath

"Can't Get It Out of My Head" was released as a single (with "Illusions in G Major" as the B-side) and was a success in the US. An edited version of "Boy Blue" was released as the album's second single, but failed to make any commercial impact. The album was certified Gold in the United States soon after its release. The album and singles, however, failed to find a wide audience in the band's native United Kingdom.

In 1978, the filmmaker Kenneth Anger re-released his 1954 film Inauguration of the Pleasure Dome, using Eldorado as the soundtrack.

In July 2010, the album was named one of Classic Rock magazines "50 Albums That Built Prog Rock".

On 17 June 2015, the album was ranked #43 on Rolling Stones "50 Greatest Prog Rock Albums of All Time"

Track listing

Personnel
Jeff Lynne – lead & backing vocals, electric & acoustic guitars, bass, Moog, production, orchestra & choral arrangements
Bev Bevan – drums, percussion
Richard Tandy – piano, Moog, clavinet, Wurlitzer electric piano, guitar, backing vocals, orchestra & choral arrangements
Mike de Albuquerque – bass & backing vocals (credited; departed during the recording of the album)
Mike Edwards – cello
Mik Kaminski – violin
Hugh McDowell – cello

Additional personnel
Peter Forbes-Robertson – spoken word
Louis Clark – orchestra and choral arrangements and conducting
Al Quaglieri – reissue producer (2001)

Charts and certifications

Weekly Charts

Year-End Charts

Certifications

References

Electric Light Orchestra albums
Albums produced by Jeff Lynne
1974 albums
Epic Records albums
Concept albums
Art rock albums by English artists
Warner Records albums
Jet Records albums
United Artists Records albums